Run is a British drama serial created by Jonathan Pearson, Marlon Smith, and Daniel Fajemisin-Duncan, and written by Marlon Smith and Daniel Fajemisin-Duncan for Channel 4. The series premiered on 15 July 2013 and ended on 18 July 2013, and was broadcast on Hulu on 20 August 2013. The series comprises four episodes, each focused on one character among the four leads - Carol (Olivia Colman), Ying (Katie Leung), Richard (Lennie James) and Kasia (Katharina Schüttler) - and shows how each character's decisions affect that character and the others.

Plot 

The series reveals the interconnectedness of apparently separate lives, through the stories of four people faced with choices in a world where survival is never a given.

Cast 

 Tara - Jaime Winstone
 Carol - Olivia Colman
 Richard - Lennie James
 Ying - Katie Leung
 Kasia - Katharina Schüttler
 Jimmy - Nav Sidhu
 Jamal - Gershwyn Eustache Jnr
 Tomek - Levan Doran
DC Holt - Marie Critchley
Zak - Vincenzo Nicoli
Jon Jon - Brad Damon
DC Burgess - Chris Jarman
Lin  - Tina Chiang

Episodes

DVD releases

Reception 
The Express has praised Run, calling it "inventive" and citing Jaime Winstone as a highlight. The Scotsman was slightly more mixed in their review, commenting that: "This gritty, grim drama will win awards but, perhaps, be too hard-going for many."

References

External links 

 
 

2013 British television series debuts
2013 British television series endings
2010s British drama television series
Channel 4 television dramas
2010s British television miniseries
English-language television shows
Television shows set in London